The 1962–63 season was the 71st season in Liverpool F.C.'s existence and their first season back in the Football League's First Division since 1953–54. Roger Hunt, who had scored 41 goals in the promotion winning league campaign, proved himself in the top flight and scored 24 goals, as Liverpool finished in 8th position in the league, and also reached the semi finals of the FA Cup.

Squad

Goalkeepers
  Tommy Lawrence
  Jim Furnell

Defenders
  Gerry Byrne
  Phil Ferns
  Alan Jones
  Chris Lawler
  Ronnie Moran
  Tommy Smith
  Bobby Thomson
  Ron Yeats

Midfielders
  Alan A'Court
  Ian Callaghan
  Tommy Leishman
  Kevin Lewis
  Jimmy Melia
  Gordon Milne
  Willie Stevenson
  Gordon Wallace
  Johnny Wheeler

Attackers
  Alf Arrowsmith
  Bobby Graham
  Roger Hunt
  Ian St John

League table

Results

First Division

FA Cup

References
 LFC History.net – 1962-63 season
 Liverweb - 1962-63 Season

Liverpool F.C. seasons
Liverpool